The 1997 FIA GT Mugello 4 Hours  was the ninth race of the 1997 FIA GT Championship season.  It was run at Mugello Circuit, Italy on September 28, 1997.

Official results
Class winners in bold.  Cars failing to complete 75% of winner's distance marked as Not Classified (NC).

Statistics
 Pole Position – #11 AMG-Mercedes – 1:41.865
 Fastest Lap – #11 AMG-Mercedes – 1:45.013
 Distance – 692.340 km
 Average Speed – 171.930 km/h

External links
 World Sports Prototype Racing – Race Results

M
Mugello 4 Hours